The Tropica or Tropica Roadster is an all-electric car made by Renaissance Cars in the 1990s. It was introduced for the model year 1995 and built in a limited number of units, but never entered series production due to financial issues.

Overview

Renaissance Cars was founded by Bob Beaumont, who previously founded the company which produced the Citicar in the 1970s. The company was headquartered in Palm Bay, Florida.

The Tropica Roadster was designed by Jim Muir.

Specifications

The car was to use an ABS body on an aluminum backbone chassis. Although the first prototype had a fiberglass unibody, later vehicles used an aluminum chassis and a plastic body.

The battery capacity was about 11.2 kWh, coming from twelve 6V lead-acid batteries, each with a capacity of 156 Ah; the batteries were removable.

The vehicle would take 6-8 hours to fully charge, but as explained by one owner, "I can get an 85% charge in about 90 mins. The remaining 6-7 hours is used to trickle charge the rest of the battery."

The vehicle had two DC motors, one for each of the rear wheels, which eliminated the need for a differential. The vehicle had no gearbox.

Production
The car was introduced in 1995 (although prospective customers were able to reserve it earlier). Approximately 16 pre-series Tropica Roadsters were produced and exhibited in showrooms, with at least some of them finding customers. According to another source, the company made 23 vehicles overall, including prototypes and pilot series vehicles. The car did not enter series production because the second financing round failed.

In 1996, the company went into receivership and most of its assets went to a newly founded company called Zebra Motors, based first in Novato and then in Alameda, California. The company announced two models, the Model Z Roadster (which was a renamed Tropica Roadster) and the Light Delivery Van (the latter featuring a swappable battery), but these did not enter series production. The company was then bought by a group of investors reportedly including actor Don Johnson and renamed Xebra Motors. Though the group planned a limited production of the Roadster, the company ultimately failed in 2001.

The car appeared in an episode of Nash Bridges (season 4, episode 17).

One Tropica Roadster is in possession of the Route 66 Electric Vehicle Museum in Kingman, Arizona.

Pricing

One user reported buying a new Tropica for $18,000. The manufacturer expected to sell it profitably for $12,500.

References

External links
 A website about the Tropica/Zebra
 The author's personal Tropica page
 Q&A about the author's Tropica/Zebra
 Renaissance Cars Inc. - model linuep, including the Roadster
 The Car and Driver article
 Another private website

Electric car models
Production electric cars